South Carolina elected its members October 13–14, 1828.

See also 
 1828 and 1829 United States House of Representatives elections
 List of United States representatives from South Carolina

Notes 

1828
South Carolina
United States House of Representatives